Gluey Porch Treatments is the debut album by American rock band Melvins, released in 1987 through Alchemy Records. The original release was vinyl only. The album was later released on cassette tape with the Six Songs EP through Boner Records and appears as bonus material on the CD version of Ozma. Tracks 18–29 can only be found on the 1999 Ipecac Recordings re-release; these songs are taken from a boombox demo.

The album is considered one of the first examples of sludge metal and a blueprint for grunge.

Background
"Steve Instant Newman" and "As It Was" are re-recordings of "Disinvite" and "Easy As It Was" respectively, as heard on the Six Songs EP.

"Leeech" was originally a song by Green River entitled "Leech." When Melvins founder Buzz Osborne asked a member of Green River why they never played the song, the reply was that the band thought it was too repetitive and was therefore dropped from their set. The song may have been essentially given to the Melvins on the spot, though Mark Arm has jokingly criticized their claim of ownership of it, teasingly saying that they inappropriately attributed the song to themselves.

The song "Eye Flys" appears on the soundtrack for the film, Kurt Cobain: About a Son and the Melvins live album Sugar Daddy Live. "Glow God," "Big As a Mountain" and "Heaviness of the Load" appear on the Alchemy Records compilation album Peace Thru Chemistry.

The title track Gluey Porch Treatments was re-recorded and released in 2001 on their thirteenth album Electroretard.

Critical reception

AllMusic critic Ned Raggett praised the album, writing: "Drawn-out syllables at the end of lines descending into murk, bellowing half-understandable insanities, flanged warbles and squeals: It's all there." Dave Grohl described it as heavier and better than Black Sabbath.

Track listing
All songs written by Buzz Osborne except where noted.

Side one

Side two

1999 CD reissue bonus tracks

Personnel
Matt Lukin – bass guitar, vocals
Buzz Osborne – vocals, guitar, liner notes on 1999 Ipecac reissue
Dale Crover – drums

Additional personnel 
Mark Deutrom – producer, mixing
Carl Herlofsson – engineer, mixing
David Musgrove – second engineer
Victor Hayden – original artwork, executive producer
Mackie Osborne – new artwork on 1999 Ipecac reissue

References

Melvins albums
1987 debut albums
Ipecac Recordings albums
Alchemy Records (U.S.) albums
Boner Records albums
Sludge metal albums
Grunge albums